In the Quechua, Aymara, and Inca mythologies, Supay was both the god of death and ruler of the Ukhu Pacha, the Incan underworld, as well as a race of demons. Supay is associated with miners' rituals.

With the Spanish colonization of the Americas, Christian priests used the name "Supay" to refer to the Christian Devil. However, unlike Europeans in relation to the Christian Devil, "the indigenous people did not repudiate Supay but, being scared of him, they invoked him and begged him not to harm them".

Supay acquired a syncretic symbolism, becoming a main character of the diabladas of Bolivia (seen in the Carnaval de Oruro), Peru and other Andean countries. The name Supay is now roughly translated into diablo (Spanish for devil) in most Southern American countries. In some of them, for example the northern region of Argentina, the underworld where Supay rules, is called "Salamanca". 

In some areas of Peru, the Quechua people continue the tradition of the Supay dance at the colonial Mamacha Candicha festivity which roughly translates as "virgin of the candle flame" known as "Virgen de la Candelaria" in Spanish and is a festival with dancing lasting up to two weeks.  However, the dance of the Supay may be performed for tourists on other occasions not necessarily related to Mamacha Candicha.

See also 
 Saqra

References

Inca gods
Death gods
Underworld gods
Quechua words and phrases
Peruvian folklore
Peruvian culture